Adriaphaenops is a genus of beetles in the family Carabidae, first described by Kurt Hermann Gustav Otto Noesske in 1928.

Species 
Adriaphaenops contains the following thirteen species:

 Adriaphaenops albanicus Lohaj, Lakota, Queinnec, Pavićević & Ceplic, 2016
 Adriaphaenops antroherponomimus (Noesske, 1928)
 Adriaphaenops jasminkoi Lohaj, Lakota, Queinnec, Pavićević & Ceplic, 2016
 Adriaphaenops kevser Queinnec, Pavicevic & Ollivier, 2008
 Adriaphaenops mlejneki Lohaj, Lakota, Queinnec, Pavićević & Ceplic, 2016
 Adriaphaenops njegosiensis Lohaj, Lakota, Queinnec, Pavićević & Ceplic, 2016
 Adriaphaenops perreaui Queinnec & Pavicevic, 2008
 Adriaphaenops petrimaris Lohaj & Delić, 2019
 Adriaphaenops pretneri Scheibel, 1935
 Adriaphaenops rumijaensis Lohaj, Lakota, Queinnec, Pavićević & Ceplic, 2016
 Adriaphaenops staudacheri Scheibel, 1939
 Adriaphaenops stirni (Pretner, 1959)
 Adriaphaenops zupcensis (Pavićević, 1990)

References

Trechinae